Barry Martin (born 1943) is a British artist associated with the kinetic art movement of the 1960s, in which physical movement was incorporated into art. Martin has also explored ideas of movement in the activities of games: among artists whose work has explored chess, Martin has been described as "perhaps the most important". His work appears in the collections of the Victoria and Albert Museum, Tate, and British Council, among others. According to the Victoria and Albert Museum: 
[Martin] has worked in various media - including kinetic sculpture, film, performance, and the making of environments - but the constant in his work has been drawing, either as a working tool, as a means of recording and observing, or as an end in itself. For Martin, drawing is a system of signs analogous to those of language, and also an intellectual process of enquiry, analysis and proposition.

References 

1943 births
21st-century British artists
Living people
20th-century British artists